Easy Come Easy Go is the fourteenth studio album by American country music artist George Strait. It was released by MCA Records and it produced four singles for Strait on the Hot Country Songs charts: the title track (#1), a cover of George Jones' 1965 hit "Lovebug" (#8), "I'd Like to Have That One Back" (#3), and "The Man in Love with You" (#5).

Barbra Streisand covered "We Must Be Loving Right" on her 1999 album A Love Like Ours.

Track listing

Personnel
As listed in liner notes.
Eddie Bayers – drums
Stuart Duncan – fiddle
Paul Franklin – steel guitar, slide guitar
Steve Gibson – acoustic guitar, electric guitar, hi-string acoustic guitar
Liana Manis – background vocals
Brent Mason – acoustic guitar, electric guitar
Matt Rollings – piano
George Strait – lead vocals
Glenn Worf – bass guitar, tic tac bass
Curtis Young – background vocals

Strings on "Without Me Around", "We Must Be Loving Right" and "The Man in Love with You" recorded at O'Henry Studios, Burbank, California. Arranged by Steve Dorff.

Charts

Weekly charts

Year-end charts

References

1993 albums
George Strait albums
MCA Records albums
Albums produced by Tony Brown (record producer)